El patrullero 777 (in English: "The Patrolman 777") is a 1978 Mexican comedy film directed by Miguel M. Delgado and starring Cantinflas, Ana Bertha Lepe and Valeria Pani. The film concludes the loose trilogy around the character of the Patrolman 777, who first appeared in The Unknown Policeman (1941) and reappeared in The Atomic Fireman (1952), although the only connection between the three films is that Cantinflas's character is a policeman who uses the callsign 777.

Plot
Sergeant Diógenes Bravo (Cantinflas) is the Patrolman 777, a member of the Mexico City police. He has a high sense of honesty, but due to his very particular way of solving problems, he is regularly berated by his superior, Major Malagón (Wolf Ruvinskis). While on duty, Bravo meets a group of prostitutes, among them Claudia Loza "La clarines" (Ana Bertha Lepe) and Guadalupe "La Pingüis" (Valeria Pani). Bravo and his partner on the force (Julio Alejandro Lobato) investigate a gang of drug traffickers led by "El Johnny" (Ramón Menéndez), who exploits the prostitutes.

Many other stories take place through the course of the film, such as high-speed races in which wealthy young men participate in public roads and end in disgrace, and a robbery at a high society party.

In the climax of the film, Bravo and his partner stop near the Tlalpan road a band from which they confiscate high-powered weapons, including grenades. Subsequently, "La Pingüis" provides information to Bravo about an illegal operation by El Johnny's gang. Bravo and his partner attend the scene, where they are received with gunshots, during which Bravo results injured. To prevent the escape of criminals, Bravo uses one of the seized grenades to blow up a truck full of drugs. Bravo is congratulated by his superiors and the film ends in a formal ceremony in which he is promoted to Lieutenant, with the police contingent activating the sirens of his vehicles as a sign of respect.

Cast
Cantinflas as Diógenes Bravo, Patrolman 777
Ana Bertha Lepe as Claudia Loza "La clarines"
Valeria Pani as Guadalupe "La Pingüis"
Wolf Ruvinskis as Major Urbano Malagón
Julio Alejandro Lobato as Patrolman 777's partner
Ramón Menéndez as El Johnny
Carlos Riquelme as Deputy
Samia Farah as Tarzana de la Flor "La rompecatres" ("The Cot Breaker")
Rosángela Balbó as Blonde guest at party
Yolanda Rigel as Nurse
Mayte Carol as Sofía Beltrán "La chofi"
María Montaño as Dolores Barreto "La motivosa"
César Sobrevals as Marcos Muñoz
Ángel de la Peña García (como Angel de la Peña)
Federico González as Second Shift Deputy
Jose Luis Said
Eduardo Noriega as Father of arrogant young man
Amparo Arozamena as Lady in police station
Laura Zapata as Miss in police station
Alejandro Ciangherotti as Serenade Man
Ofelia Guilmáin as Violent Wife
Fernando Luján as Suicidal Man
Pompín Iglesias as Priest
Eva Calvo as Mother-in-law of suicidal man
Guillermo Orea as Drunk Lawyer
Norma Herrera as Pregnant Woman
Alfonso Carti as Policeman who arrests "La clarines" (uncredited)
Alberto Catalá as Secretary of police station (uncredited)
Leonardo Daniel as Arrogant young man (uncredited)
Cecilia Leger as Neighbor of suicidal man (uncredited)
Maricruz Nájera as Neighbor of suicidal man (uncredited)
Carlos Suárez as Policeman (uncredited)
Marcelo Villamil as Party guest (uncredited)
Fernando Yapur as El Johnny's henchman (uncredited)

Reception
In Cantinflas and the Chaos of Mexican Modernity, Professor Jeffrey M. Pilcher questioned the idea of the film portraying a sympathetic policeman, noting that at the time, corruption within the Mexico City police reached new highs under chief of police Arturo "El Negro" Durazo, who was under indictment in the United States for drug trafficking, and accused Cantinflas of "pathetically selling out his beloved old gendarme character to the power elite." Pilcher stated that "the irony was not lost on reviewers," citing that reviewers at the time described the film as "a contribution to making the abominable and feared 'blues' [of the capital's police force] sympathetic." With regards of Cantinflas's performance, Pilcher stated, "Having gone thick in the middle at the age of sixty-six, he fit poorly in a police uniform; drooping pants had become completely unthinkable. But advanced years did not stop him from carrying his duties of karate chopping drug pushers, rescuing fallen women, and lecturing hippies." Both Carlos Monsiváis in Los ídolos a nado and Joanne Hershfield and David R. Maciel in Mexico's Cinema: A Century of Film and Filmmakers considered that the film "confirmed that it is impossible the return to the vehemence of The Unknown Policeman."

References

Bibliography
Pilcher, Jeffrey M. Cantinflas and the Chaos of Mexican Modernity. Rowman & Littlefield, 2001.
Monsiváis, Carlos. Los ídolos a nado: Una antología global. Penguin Random House Grupo Editorial España, 2011.
Hershfield, Joanne; Maciel, David R. Mexico's Cinema: A Century of Film and Filmmakers. Rowman & Littlefield, 1999.

External links

1978 comedy films
1978 films
Mexican comedy films
Films directed by Miguel M. Delgado
1970s police comedy films
Films set in Mexico City
1970s Mexican films